Lieutenant Colonel George Bray McMillan (October 13, 1916 – June 24, 1944) was a United States Army Air Forces fighter pilot, Squadron Commander, combat "ace" and member of the American Volunteer Group better known as the Flying Tigers.

Early life

McMillan was born in Winter Garden, Florida and attended Lakeview High School.  He developed an early interest in flying and sought an appointment to West Point and the U.S. Naval Academy but after failing to receive one enrolled at Marion Military Institute in Alabama;  he attended for one year then transferred to The Citadel in Charleston, South Carolina as a member of the Class of 1938. When McMillan was six credits away from graduating, he decommissioned to join the American Volunteer Group. In 2022, The Citadel awarded a posthumous degree to the veteran.

Military service
McMillan was accepted into the U.S. Army Aviation Cadet Training Program (USAAF) and attended pilot training at Randolph Field, Texas receiving his wings in May, 1939.  He subsequently served as a fighter pilot flying the Curtiss P-36 Hawk aircraft with the 55th Pursuit Squadron at Barksdale Field, Louisiana and the 23d Composite Group at Maxwell Field, Alabama, Orlando Army Air Base and Eglin Field, Florida; he also attended the Air Corps Advanced Flying School at Kelly Field, Texas.

Flying Tigers

In July, 1941 McMillan was one of 100 military pilots to answer a call for volunteers to serve as civilians employed by the Chinese government to aid in their fight against the Japanese.
He resigned his Army commission and sailed for Asia aboard the Dutch liner Blomfontein on July 24, arriving in Rangoon, Burma the following month.  McMillan was assigned to the 3d Squadron (“Hells Angels”) of the 1st American Volunteer Group flying the Curtiss P-40 Warhawk; he served as a Flight Leader, Operations Officer and Vice Commander of the unit,  being credited with 4.5 aerial victories and surviving a crash landing after his plane was badly damaged during a mission on Christmas Day of 1941In March of 1942 McMillan and 3 other AVG pilots were sent on a 14,000 mile odyssey to pick up brand new P-40E aircraft in Accra, Ghana and ferry them back to China by way of Nigeria, Sudan, Egypt, Bahrain and Pakistan.

Later World War II service
After the AVG was disbanded in July 1942, McMillan remained in China briefly to help organize the new 23d Fighter Group. After returning stateside he was recommissioned as a Major in the Army Air Forces and assigned to the 1st Proving Ground Group in Florida where he served as a test pilot flying virtually every aircraft in the inventory.  He returned to China in October, 1943 serving briefly with the Chinese-American Composite Wing (Provisional) then was assigned to the 449th Squadron of the 51st Fighter Group flying the Lockheed P-38 Lightning and again serving under General Claire Lee Chennault who had commanded the Flying Tigers; promoted to Lieutenant Colonel he was named Commander of the squadron the following month. He was credited with destroying 4 more Japanese aircraft before being shot down and killed on his 53d mission near Pingxiang, China on June 24, 1944;
his remains were buried at a cemetery in Shanghai then eventually reinterred at Arlington National Cemetery.His 8.5 aerial victories make him one of 26 Flying Tigers pilots to have become an "ace" by the end of World War II.

Awards and decorations

References

External links
U.S.A.F. Veteran Online Memorial | TWS Roll of Honor
P-40 Warhawk Aces of the CBI
McMillan, George Bray | Flying Tigers AVG
George Bray McMillan : Lieutenant Colonel from Florida, World War II Casualty
Flying Tigers: AVG victory credits for Japanese aircraft
Winter Garden hero soared with Flying Tigers

Sources
Losonsky, Frank S. Flying Tiger: A Crew Chief's Story: The War Diary of an AVG Crew Chief. Atglen, Pennsylvania: Schiffer Publishing, 2000. .
Olynyk, Frank J. AVG & USAAF (China-Burma-India Theater) Credits for Destruction of Enemy Aircraft in Air to Air Combat, World War 2. Aurora, Ohio: Privately published, 1986. 
Pistole, Larry M. The Pictorial History of the Flying Tigers Publishers Press, Inc. Orange, Virginia

1944 deaths
1916 births
American World War II flying aces
People from Winter Garden, Florida
United States Army Air Forces pilots of World War II
The Citadel, The Military College of South Carolina alumni
Burials at Arlington National Cemetery
United States Army Air Forces personnel killed in World War II
Recipients of the Air Medal
Recipients of the Distinguished Flying Cross (United States)
Aviators killed by being shot down
Aviators killed in aviation accidents or incidents in China